Nouvel Catholic Central High School is a private, Catholic high school located in Saginaw Charter Township, Michigan and serving the Saginaw region.  Nouvel is a high school that enrolls approximately 150 students.  The school was formed in 1984 as a consolidation of the three then-remaining Saginaw area Catholic high schools, Saints Peter and Paul, Saint Stephen's, and Saint Mary's Cathedral High Schools.

Prior to the existence of Nouvel Catholic Central High School and Saints Peter and Paul Area High School, the school building, which also houses the offices of the Roman Catholic Diocese of Saginaw, was the Saint Paul Seminary.  That name is still inscribed in marble above the front door of Nouvel High School.

The school is named for Father Henri Nouvel, a 17th-century French Jesuit missionary who is locally recognized as the first European to have visited the Saginaw River Valley region. A monument recognizing Fr. Nouvel and his contributions sits on Ojibway Island in the City of Saginaw, and a local council of the Knights of Columbus established in Father Nouvel's honor has their main hall located near the school.

Academics 
- 98% of graduates are college bound
- Average ACT score above state and national average
- Over 73% of Nouvel students have a GPA of 2.0 or better.

Brian d'Arcy James, a 1986 graduate, is an American actor and musician.

Faith development 
- Teachings of Catholic Church open to all
- Building discipleship by serving the community through East Side Soup Kitchen,
Special Olympics, Glenmary Mission Retreat, and more
- Applying Christian values to life decisions

Extracurricular opportunities 

- Over 90% of students participate in extra-curricular activities
- Choirs include honors, madrigals, and chimes
- Band
- 18 sports programs
- Biannual theater productions
- Organizations and clubs including SADD, Teens for Life, Science Olympiad, Quiz Bowl

- A steel drum band was recently added as of 2011

Nouvel receives national honors 
Saginaw's Nouvel Catholic Central has been recognized as one of the top 50 Catholic high schools in the nation

The honor comes from the Catholic High School Honor Roll, which measures academic excellence, Catholic identity and civic education.

Sports 

The Nouvel Panthers compete as members of the Tri-Valley Conference West Division during the regular season. Although the school has enjoyed a fair amount of athletic success, the 2006-2007 school year was arguably the school's most notable in athletic achievement. The Nouvel Football and Girls Basketball teams won State Championships, and in doing so became the first school in MHSAA history to have both teams go undefeated in the same season.   The same year, Nouvel finished as State Runner-Up in Boys Basketball and a State Semifinalist in Baseball.

In the record-breaking 2007-2008 year:
The Nouvel Varsity Pom Pon team won their very first Class C State Title. The Nouvel boys won a second straight MHSAA Division 6 state championship in football.The Nouvel Girls Varsity Basketball team also won back to back state championships in Class C. This marks the first time in Michigan High School sports history that a school's boys football team and girls basketball team have won state titles in consecutive years.

In 2009, Jenny Ryan was named Miss Basketball, this marks the first time in MHSAA history that two people from the same school were named Miss Basketball. Danielle Kamm was named Miss Basketball in 2002 - 2003 season.

In 2011, the Nouvel Boys Varsity football team repeated as State Champions for a third time, winning the Division 7 title in a 56-26 victory.  The Panthers set a state record for most points scored in a state finals football game.  Running back Bennett Lewis tied the state record for scoring, with five touchdowns to his credit in the game.

In 2013, the Nouvel Varsity Pom Pon team won their second Class C State Title.

Blair White, a stand-out wide receiver for the Panthers from 2000–2004, signed with the Indianapolis Colts following the 2010 NFL Draft.  White was a walk-on at Michigan State University and was named the Big Ten Wide Receiver of the Year in 2010.

References

External links
 Official Website 
 Diocese of Saginaw
 Nouvel News

Roman Catholic Diocese of Saginaw
Catholic secondary schools in Michigan
Educational institutions established in 1984
Schools in Saginaw County, Michigan
1984 establishments in Michigan
Saginaw Intermediate School District